Breege Connolly (born 1 February 1978) is an Irish marathon runner. She placed 76th at the 2016 Olympics in a time of 2:44:41.

Connolly took up athletics around 2005. Her cousin Teresa Doherty is a former cross country running competitor.

References

Living people
Athletes from the Republic of Ireland
Irish female marathon runners
Athletes (track and field) at the 2016 Summer Olympics
Olympic athletes of Ireland
1978 births
Place of birth missing (living people)